Berhe is a surname of Eritrean and Tigrayan origin, and may refer to:

 Asmeret Asefaw Berhe, director of the Office of Science at the U.S. Department of Energy
 Arefaine Berhe (born before 1997), Eritrean minister
 Eyasu Berhe (1956-2010), Ethiopian singer, writer, producer and poet 
 Nat Berhe (born 1991), American professional football player
 Ruth Berhe (born 1995), Canadian singer-songwriter

Surnames of African origin